Jeff Lipsky may refer to:
 Jeff Lipsky (photographer)
 Jeff Lipsky (filmmaker)